This is a list of notable basketball players who died while still on a team roster or as a free agent. A majority died in accidents such as car or plane crashes. Some suffered sudden cardiac death, which has a higher incidence in basketball among young athletes. Some suffered from the heart condition hypertrophic cardiomyopathy, which is more common in African Americans. Basketball has a considerably higher ratio of African-Americans than other sports. Other deaths were caused by drug abuse.

Included are players in the NBA, college, and other leagues. Players who died following the conclusion of their career should not be included. Players are listed with the team for which they last played before death, rather than the team with which the player spent most of their playing career. 

Basketball teams may honor active players who died by bestowing upon them a posthumous honor of a retired number.

Deaths of active players with individually notable careers

Evansville Purple Aces plane crash
Fourteen members of the 1977–78 Evansville Purple Aces men's basketball team died in a plane crash on December 13 1977, along with fifteen others including head coach Bobby Watson. The players killed were: 

 Seniors: Kevin Kingston, John Ed Washington, and Marion Anthony “Tony” Windburn
 Juniors: Stephen Miller and Bryan Taylor
 Sophomores: Keith Moon
 Freshmen: Warren Alston, Ray Comandella, Mike Duff, Kraig Heckendorn, Michael Joyner, Barney Lewis, Greg Smith, and Mark Siegel

Freshman David Furr, the lone member of the team who did not board Air Indiana Flight 216, died two weeks later in a car crash, meaning all the members of the team died during the 1977–78 season.

See also
 Sudden cardiac death of athletes
Len Bias, who died of a drug overdose after having been drafted, but prior to starting his NBA career
Pete Maravich, who died aged 40 at a pickup game of basketball several years after his retirement

References

Died
Basketball